Splashdown is a studio album by Philadelphia funk soul band, Breakwater.

The album is most notable for containing the song "Release the Beast", which was sampled in "Robot Rock" by Daft Punk.

Reception 
In review issued on May 3, 1980, Billboard said that the music of the album "veers to the tired galactic rock concept a bit too much, but its sound is versatile and strong".
For the week ending July 5, 1980, the album reached its peak position of number 34 on the Billboard Soul LPs chart.

Track listing
All tracks composed by Kae Williams Jr.; except where noted.
Side A
 "Splashdown Time" (Kae Williams Jr., James Gee Jones, Rick Chertoff, Vince Garnell) - (5:56)
 "Love of My Life" - (4:25)
 "Release the Beast" (Kae Williams Jr., Gene Robinson, Vince Garnell) - (4:57)
 "The One in My Dreams" (4:44)

Side B
 "You" (3:46)
 "Say You Love Me Girl" (Kae Williams Jr., Gene Robinson) - (4:46)
 "Let Love In" (4:40)
 "Time" (3:56)

Personnel 
James Gee Jones – drums, vibraphone, vocals
Steve Green – bass, vocals
John "Dutch" Braddock – congas, percussion, timbales
Linc "Love" Gilmore – guitar
Gene Robinson, Jr. – lead vocals, vocal arrangements, trumpet
Kae Williams, Jr. – producer, vocals, synthesizers (ARP 2600, Mini-Moog, Prophet 5, ARP Omni), Fender Rhodes, piano, clavinet
Greg Scott – tenor saxophone, alto saxophone, baritone saxophone, lyricon, horn arrangements
Leonard "Dr." Gibbs, Jr. – timbales (track B2 only)
Bill Reichenbach – trombone
Gary Grant – trumpet
Jerry Hey – trumpet
Larry G. Hall – trumpet
Linc "Love" Gilmore – vocals
Vince Garnell – vocals, woodwind

Production 
Rick Chertoff – producer
 Don Murray – engineer
William Wittman – engineer
Daniel Protheroe – assistant engineer

Managerial and design 
Donn Davenport – art direction
Gary Gross – photography

References 

1980 albums
Breakwater (band) albums
Arista Records albums
Albums produced by Rick Chertoff